Maarten van Roozendaal (2 May 1962 – 1 July 2013) was a Dutch singer, comedian and songwriter. He recorded "I'm So Curious", and variously worked with Paul de Munnik, Willem Ennes, Egon Kracht, Marcel de Groot and Kim Soepnel.

Biography
Van Roozendaal was born in Heiloo, North Holland, Netherlands. In his youth he was involved with music, and he combined this with his work as a bartender. He wrote music for Teleac school television, playing piano, plus he played drums in a punk band, and directed and advised other artists. In 1994, he won the jury and audience at the Cabaret Festival. He mainly performed his own work, but also that of Cornelis Vreeswijk and Bram Vermeulen. Van Roozendaal also put some poems by Jean Pierre Rawie to music.

Van Roozendaal's work was sometimes of a melancholy tone, at other times cynical. His recurring themes are life, love, death and drink.

On 8 February 2013 it was made public that Van Roozendaal was terminally ill with lung cancer. Subsequently all of his performances were cancelled. Van Roozendaal died on 1 July 2013 at the age of 51.

Theater
February 29, 2012: The Common Denominator, theater concert
May–November 2011: Nostalgia for the sky with Paul de Munnik
July–August 2010: Hauser Orkater Tribute to Egon Kracht & The Troupe, Jan-Paul Buijs, Marcel de Groot and Thomas Spijkerman for the Parade
2010–2011: Without friends, solo program
December 2009: Late Night 2009 Lebbis
2009: And Call It But Friends with Egon Force, Marcel de Groot, Wouter Planteijdt, Richard Heijerman and Nico Brandsen
September 2008: Cabaret who does not like the! Gang of Four with Kees Torn, Jeroen van Merwijk and Theo Nijland
2008–2009: The Wild West with Egon Power and Marcel de Groot
2007: Stormgek (family program) with theater house on the Amstel
2005–2006: Barmhart with Egon Power and Marcel de Groot
July–August 2005: Yet more nasty with Bob Fosko, Pierre van Duijl, Wouter Planteijdt, Richard Heijerman and Peter Wassenaar for the Parade
2004–2005: Maarten van Roozendaal Collects Work with Egon Power, Jeffrey Bruinsma, Michiel van Dijk and Marcel de Groot
2004: old trash at Theatre Flint with Felix Strategier, Joeri de Graaf and Egon Force (for De Roode Cinema, Amsterdam)
July–August 2003: Nothing but rottenness with! Bob Fosko, Beatrice van der Poel, Wouter Planteijdt, Ro Krom and Nico Brandsen for the Parade
2002–2004: Temporary Shortage Chronic Happiness with Egon Power
2002: The Abstract with Egon Force (exclusively for The Red Cinema, Amsterdam)
2000–2002: On Counting down with Egon Power
1998–2000: Christmas in April with Egon Power
1996–1998: Exhale with Kim Soepnel (second season with Egon Force)
1994–1996: Night with Kim Soepnel

Discography
With Paul de Munnik
2011: Longing for Heaven
With Egon Kracht, Marcel de Groot, Wouter Planteijdt, Richard Heijerman and Nico Brandsen
2010: And call it friends in real life
2009: And call it friends
With Egon Kracht and Marcel de Groot
2008: The Wild West
2006: Barmhart
With Willem Ennes for Children for Children
2005: I'm so curious (single)
With Egon Kracht, Jeffrey Bruinsma, Michiel van Dijk and Marcel de Groot
2005: Maarten van Roozendaal collects work
With Egon Kracht
2003: Temporary Shortage Of Chronic Happiness
2000: On Sociability Ten Under (premiere)
2001: Don't save me (single)
2000: Faithfulness (single)
1999: Christmas in April
With Kim Soepnel
1997: Exhale
1995: Night

Books and DVDs
2009: So Far and Beyond (CD)
2009: Call it Friends (CD)
2009: Wild West (DVD)
2008: Barmhart (DVD and book)
2005: ''Deliver Me Not (Lyrics book)

References

External links

1962 births
2013 deaths
Dutch male comedians
Dutch male singer-songwriters
Deaths from lung cancer in the Netherlands
People from Heiloo